Jiukeshu Subdistrict is a subdistrict located at the northwest of Tongzhou District, Beijing. It borders Beiyuan Subdistrict in its north, Yuqiao and Linheli Subdistricts in its east, Liyuan Town in its south, and Heizhuanghu Township in its west.

The subdistrict was created from part of Liyuan Town in 2020.

Administrative divisions 

In 2021, the subdistrict was formed from 12 residential communities:

See also 
 List of township-level divisions of Beijing

References 

Tongzhou District, Beijing
Subdistricts of Beijing